Longhua is one district in Haikou City, Hainan.

The Mission Hills Haikou golf course (and Ritz-Carlton Haikou hotel), which is regarded as one of the best golf courses in China, is located within this district.

Administrative regions

Longhua district has jurisdiction over Zhongshan Road, Jinmao Road, Datong Road, Haiken Road, and Jinyu Road.  It also contains the small towns of Chengxi, Longqiao, Xinpo, Zuntan, and Longquan.

Haikou